Beatragus antiquus, the ancient hirola, is an extinct species of alcelaphine antelope that lived in Africa during the Plio-Pleistocene.

Discovery
Beatragus antiquus was first described by Louis Leakey in 1965 from material discovered at the Olduvai Gorge (Beds I and II) in Tanzania. Other remains dated slightly earlier have also been found in the Omo valley and possibly at Elandsfontein in South Africa.

Description
The ancient hirola was larger than the modern day hirola, and the two together may represent a chronospecies. Other differences with the hirola include horn cores diverging immediately from their bases, a lessening of distal divergence, more upright insertions in side view and wider and more convex frontals of the horn cores.

Paleoecology
It lived in vast savannas alongside other alcelaphine antelopes, such as a small species of Damaliscus and Parmularius. The ancient hirola probably declined as a result of diminished habitat preferences, and the modern species, with its smaller size and less energy demands, eventually evolved to cope with the new ecologically impoverished landscape.

References

Prehistoric even-toed ungulates
Pleistocene even-toed ungulates
Prehistoric bovids
Pleistocene mammals of Africa